Cleptometopus is a genus of beetles in the family Cerambycidae, containing the following species:

 Cleptometopus angustrifrons Breuning, 1940
 Cleptometopus annulaticornis Matsushita, 1944
 Cleptometopus armatus  (Jordan, 1894)
 Cleptometopus assamanus Breuning, 1967
 Cleptometopus auratoides Breuning & Itzinger, 1943
 Cleptometopus aureovittatus Breuning, 1947
 Cleptometopus basifossulatus Breuning, 1940
 Cleptometopus bhutanensis Breuning, 1975
 Cleptometopus biapicatus Breuning, 1942
 Cleptometopus bimaculatus (Bates, 1873)
 Cleptometopus cameroni Breuning, 1972
 Cleptometopus camuripes (Newman, 1842)
 Cleptometopus celebensis Breuning, 1942
 Cleptometopus cephalotes (Pic, 1926)
 Cleptometopus enganensis Gahan, 1907
 Cleptometopus filifer (Pascoe, 1866)
 Cleptometopus fisheri Gardner, 1941
 Cleptometopus flavolineatus Breuning, 1961
 Cleptometopus fuscosignatus Breuning, 1947
 Cleptometopus grandis Jordan, 1894
 Cleptometopus grossepunctatus Breuning, 1940
 Cleptometopus humeralis Gahan, 1907
 Cleptometopus indistinctus Breuning, 1940
 Cleptometopus invitticollis Breuning, 1958
 Cleptometopus javanicus Breuning, 1943
 Cleptometopus lepturoides Breuning, 1940
 Cleptometopus lobatus Breuning, 1940
 Cleptometopus luteonotatus (Pic, 1925)
 Cleptometopus malaisei Breuning, 1949
 Cleptometopus mimolivaceus Breuning, 1972
 Cleptometopus mindanaonis Breuning, 1940
 Cleptometopus mniszechii (Lacordaire, 1872)
 Cleptometopus montanus (Pascoe, 1866)
 Cleptometopus mussardi Breuning, 1977
 Cleptometopus niasensis Breuning, 1943
 Cleptometopus niasicus Aurivillius, 1926
 Cleptometopus ochreomaculatus Breuning, 1982
 Cleptometopus ochreoscutellaris Breuning, 1943
 Cleptometopus olivaceus Breuning, 1942
 Cleptometopus padangensis Breuning, 1943
 Cleptometopus papuanus Breuning, 1943
 Cleptometopus parolivaceus Breuning, 1966
 Cleptometopus perakensis Breuning, 1940
 Cleptometopus pseudolivaceus Breuning, 1975
 Cleptometopus pseudotenellus Breuning, 1950
 Cleptometopus quadrilineatus (Pic, 1924)
 Cleptometopus schmidi Breuning, 1971
 Cleptometopus scutellatus Hüdepohl, 1996
 Cleptometopus sericeus Gahan, 1895
 Cleptometopus sikkimensis Breuning, 1971
 Cleptometopus similis Gahan, 1895
 Cleptometopus simillimus Breuning, 1947
 Cleptometopus strandi Breuning, 1942
 Cleptometopus striatopunctatus Breuning, 1940
 Cleptometopus subolivaceus Breuning, 1949
 Cleptometopus subteraureus Breuning, 1967
 Cleptometopus subundulatus Breuning, 1966
 Cleptometopus sumatranus Breuning, 1942
 Cleptometopus tenellus (Pascoe, 1866)
 Cleptometopus terrestris J. Thomson, 1864
 Cleptometopus trilineatus (Pic, 1924)
 Cleptometopus undulatus (Pic, 1934)
 Cleptometopus unicolor Breuning, 1940

References

 
Agapanthiini
Cerambycidae genera